Spermacoce ovalifolia, the broadleaf false buttonweed, is a species of plants in the Rubiaceae. It is native to Mexico, Central America, parts of the Caribbean (Cuba, Puerto Rico, Haiti, Trinidad, and the Windward Islands), and South America (Venezuela,  Colombia, Ecuador, Peru, Bolivia, Brazil, Paraguay).

Spermacoce ovalifolia is an annual herb about 30 cm tall. Leaves are ovate, up to 4 cm long. flowers are very small, in dense axillary clusters.

References

External links
photo of herbarium specimen at Missouri Botanical Garden, collected in Jalisco in 1889, isotype of Spermacoce pringlei, synonym of Spermacoce ovalifolia
Gardening Europe 

ovalifolia
Flora of Mexico
Flora of Central America
Flora of Cuba
Flora of Puerto Rico
Flora of Trinidad and Tobago
Flora of the Windward Islands
Flora of Venezuela
Flora of Colombia
Flora of Ecuador
Flora of Bolivia
Flora of Brazil
Flora of Paraguay
Plants described in 1844
Flora without expected TNC conservation status